The 1964–65 Botola is the 9th season of the Moroccan Premier League. MAS Fez are the holders of the title.

References

Morocco 1964–65

Botola seasons
Morocco
Botola